The Roads & Traffic Authority (RTA)  was an agency of the New South Wales Government responsible for major road infrastructure, licensing of drivers, and registration of motor vehicles.  The RTA directly managed state roads and provided funding to local councils for regional and local roads. In addition, with assistance from the federal government, the RTA also managed the NSW national highway system. The agency was abolished in 2011 and replaced by New South Wales Roads and Maritime Services.

History
The Department of Main Roads (DMR) was created in November 1932, and undertook works across New South Wales, including maintenance of all major roads into Sydney and programs of road reconstruction, construction, upgrading and rerouting. The DMR was also responsible for many ferries and bridges in New South Wales.

On 1 November 2011, the Roads & Traffic Authority in turn was merged with NSW Maritime to become Roads and Maritime Services. Planning and co-ordination functions were transferred to Transport for NSW.

On 1 December 2019, the Roads and Maritime Services (RMS) was dissolved by act of parliament and merged with Transport for New South Wales

Regions of the RTA

The Roads and Traffic Authority was divided into six regions:

Sydney region encompassed the area of the Sydney metropolitan and the Blue Mountains areas
The Hunter Region encompassed the Hunter Region, Central Coast and the southern portion of the Mid North Coast
Northern Region extended from about Taree to the Queensland border, and goes as far inland as Tamworth, called "New England"
Southern Region encompassed the land south east of the ACT and the Illawarra area near Wollongong
South West Region encompassed essentially the land west of the Australian Capital Territory to the South Australia border, extending from the Murray River up to around West Wyalong called the Riverina
Western Region encompassed the remaining section in the west and north west of the state

Functions

Vehicle registration

The Roads & Traffic Authority was responsible for the registration of vehicles (including the issuing of registration plates) and the issuing of drivers licences in New South Wales, including testing and administering of licences. Additionally, the RTA produced photo cards for identification of non-drivers and issued photographic firearms licences for the New South Wales Police Firearms Registry, security licences for the New South Wales Police, Commercial Agents & Private Inquiry Agents cards and mobility parking permits.

Key building projects
Key road-building projects that the Roads & Traffic Authority undertook either directly, through contractors or via public/private partnerships, include:

On-going completion of a four-lane dual carriageway of the Princes Highway from the Jervis Bay turnoff to link up with the Sydney Orbital Network near Mascot and on-going completion of the upgrading of the Pacific Highway to continuous dual carriageway (minimum four-lane) standard between the Sydney Newcastle Freeway and the Queensland border, by 2020.

Major incident response
Within NSW, the Transport Management Centre is responsible for managing special events and unplanned incidents and disseminating information to motorists. It is the central point for identifying and directing the response to incidents such as crashes, breakdowns and spills. It passes on information to the public through the media, the RTA call centre and variable message signs along routes.

In 1999 the NSW Transport Management Centre (TMC) established Traffic Commander and Traffic Emergency Patrol (TEP) services throughout the Greater Urban Area of Sydney to provide 24-hour 365-day-a-year coverage to "Manage the traffic arrangements around an incident scene and return the road to normal operating conditions with the utmost urgency."

Traffic commanders take command of traffic management arrangements at an incident (such as a motor vehicle collision) and liaise with other response agencies such as the police, and assist in clearing the road and minimising the effects and disruption to traffic.  Traffic Emergency Patrols vans patrol major road routes and respond to unplanned incidents with the aim of returning the road to normal operating conditions as soon as possible.  Both traffic commanders and TEP units carry a wide array of traffic management devices such as traffic cones, barrier boards and road signage.  Both also are permitted to use and display red and blue emergency lighting and are designated as 'emergency vehicles'.

Recently completed projects
 Dual carriageway completion on the whole Hume Highway and the Great Western Highway (between Sydney and Katoomba only).
 Lawrence Hargrave Drive
 North Kiama Bypass
 Sydney Orbital Network (including Westlink M7, Cross City Tunnel, Lane Cove Tunnel, Western Distributor, General Holmes Drive, M4 Western Motorway,  Southern Cross Drive, Sydney Harbour Bridge, Sydney Harbour Tunnel, Cahill Expressway, M5 Motorway, M5 East, M2 Hills Motorway, Gore Hill Freeway, Warringah Freeway and Eastern Distributor).

Ferry services

The RTA was responsible for the provision of several car ferries, all of which were toll-free, including:

 Berowra Waters Ferry, across Berowra Waters
 Lawrence Ferry, across the Clarence River
 Mortlake Ferry, across the Parramatta River in Sydney
 Sackville Ferry, across the Hawkesbury River near the village of Sackville
 Speewa Ferry, across the Murray River between New South Wales and Victoria
 Ulmarra Ferry, across the Clarence River
 Webbs Creek Ferry, across the Hawkesbury River in the village of Wisemans Ferry
 Wisemans Ferry, across the Hawkesbury River in the village of Wisemans Ferry
 Wymah Ferry, across the Murray River between New South Wales and Victoria

References

General 
Great Western Highway
Sydney to Melbourne strategy
Hume Highway duplication package
Coolac Bypass
Pacific Highway
Princes Highway strategy.
More completed projects from the RTA

External links

Roads and Traffic Authority
SCATS - Sydney Coordinated Adaptive Traffic System Website

Defunct government entities of New South Wales
Road authorities

Defunct transport organisations based in Australia